

The Diocese of Luni was a Roman Catholic bishopric with its seat in Luni, Liguria, northwestern Italy. The bishop and cathedral chapter moved to Sarzana in the 12th century; the move was formalised in 1201. Though the bishops of Luni had been resident at Sarzana long before the official transfer of the cathedral, the diocese and bishop continued to use the name of Luni in their titles down to 1465, when the name of Sarzana was added to both.

The name of the former diocese was revived in 1976 to designate a titular see.

See also 
Roman Catholic Diocese of La Spezia-Sarzana-Brugnato (list of Bishops of Luni)

References

External links 
 GCatholic with incumbent bio links

Bibliography 

   (in Latin)
 pp. 817–818. (Use with caution; obsolete)
Gentile, Michele Lupo (1912). Il Regesto del Codice Pelavicino in: Atti della Società ligure di storia patria, Vol. XLIV (Genova 1912).
Kehr, Paul Fridolin (1914). Italia pontificia : sive, Repertorium privilegiorum et litterarum a romanis pontificibus ante annum 1598 Italiae ecclesiis, monasteriis, civitatibus singulisque personis concessorum. Vol. VI. pars ii. Berolini: Weidmann. pp. 373–392. (in Latin)
  [II, pp. 2–156; 156-159; 159-184]
 [Luni and Sarzana]

Catholic titular sees in Europe
Former Roman Catholic dioceses in Italy